Bystrzyca Stara  is a village in the administrative district of Gmina Strzyżewice, within Lublin County, Lublin Voivodeship, in eastern Poland.

The first known mention of Bystrzyca Stara dates back to 1399. It currently has a population of around 450.  The village has a primary school, a middle school and a church.

References

Villages in Lublin County